Open House London is an annual festival celebrating the architecture and urban landscape of London. It is staged by the charity Open City which campaigns to make London a more accessible, equitable and open city. During the Open House festival, many buildings considered to be of architectural significance open their doors for free public tours.

The 2019 event featured over 800 buildings, neighbourhood walks, architects' talks, cycle tours, and more. Well-known buildings not usually open to the public which were open on Open House weekend in 2005, for example, included Marlborough House, Lancaster House, Mansion House, the Foreign and Commonwealth Office, and Horse Guards.

In a typical year, Open House Weekend attracts around 250,000 people.

Outside of the Open House festival, Open City organises other projects including year-round tours, lectures and educational events for children and young people.

The 2020 Open House festival featured a diverse set of events to attend both virtually and physically. Changes were made to ensure Open House was safe and comfortable in line with government guidelines.

The 2022 edition will take place between 8 and 21 September.

The Open House Key
The Open House festival uses a key as its emblem, the blade formed in the shape of London's skyline.

See also
 Historic Houses Association
 Open House New York
 Open House Chicago
 Open House Brno
 Doors Open Days
 Treasure Houses of England
 Manchester Curious - Open House in Manchester
 Visit My Mosque

References

External links

London
Annual events in London
Architecture of London
Cultural organisations based in London
Recurring events established in 1992